Joan Whitney may refer to:

Joan Whitney Payson, heiress and New York Mets owner
Joan Whitney (actress)
Joan Whitney Kramer, American singer and songwriter